In mathematics, conical functions or Mehler functions are functions which can be expressed in terms of Legendre functions of the first and second kind,
 and 

The functions  were introduced by Gustav Ferdinand Mehler, in 1868, when expanding in series the distance of a point on the axis of a cone to a point located on the surface of the cone. Mehler used the notation  to represent these functions. He obtained integral representation and series of functions representations for them. He also established an addition theorem
for the conical functions. Carl Neumann obtained an expansion of the functions  in terms
of the Legendre polynomials in 1881. Leonhardt introduced for the conical functions the equivalent of the spherical harmonics in 1882.

External links

  G. F. Mehler "Ueber die Vertheilung der statischen Elektricität in einem von zwei Kugelkalotten begrenzten Körper" Journal für die reine und angewandte Mathematik 68, 134 (1868).
 G. F.  Mehler "Ueber eine mit den Kugel- und Cylinderfunctionen verwandte Function und ihre Anwendung in der Theorie der Elektricitätsvertheilung" Mathematische Annalen 18 p. 161 (1881).
 C. Neumann "Ueber die Mehler'schen Kegelfunctionen und deren Anwendung auf elektrostatische Probleme" Mathematische Annalen 18 p. 195 (1881).
 G. Leonhardt " 	 Integraleigenschaften der adjungirten Kegelfunctionen" Mathematische Annalen 19 p. 578 (1882).
 
 Milton Abramowitz and Irene Stegun (Eds.) Handbook of Mathematical Functions (Dover, 1972) p. 337
 A. Gil, J. Segura, N. M. Temme "Computing the conical function $P^{\mu}_{-1/2+i\tau}(x)$" SIAM J. Sci. Comput. 31(3), 1716–1741 (2009). 
 Tiwari, U. N.; Pandey, J. N. The Mehler-Fock transform of distributions. Rocky Mountain J. Math. 10 (1980), no. 2, 401–408. 

Special functions